Mustafa Kemal Atatürk Monument is a statue of former Turkish president Kemal Atatürk (1881–1938), located in Azerbaijan's capital, Baku.

Description
The sculptor of the statue is People's Artist of the Republic of Azerbaijan, Rector of the Azerbaijan Academy of Arts Ömər Eldarov.

History
The monument was opened on 17 May 2010 in a park on the intersection of Səməd Vurğun and Bakıxanov streets in front of the Turkish Embassy in Nasimi district of Baku. Azerbaijani President Ilham Aliyev and his wife Mehriban Aliyeva, then Turkish President Recep Tayyip Erdoğan and his wife Emine Erdoğan attended the opening ceremony. A guard of honor was lined up in the park decorated with the national flags of Azerbaijan and Turkey.

References

Baku
Monuments and memorials in Baku
Azerbaijan–Turkey relations
Sculptures by Omar Eldarov